Pühajärve Parish was a rural municipality of Estonia, in Valga County. The parish existed until 1950 and was re-established in 1991. In 1999, the parish was merged with Otepää town and new parish was named to Otepää Parish.

References

Valga County
Former municipalities of Estonia